Heiko Weber (born 26 June 1965 in Thale) is a German former footballer who is now manager of ZFC Meuselwitz.

Career
As player he played for FC Carl Zeiss Jena and Preußen Münster.

Coaching career
In 2007, he was caretaker manager in FC Energie Cottbus, when Petrik Sander was fired and later Teamchef of FC Erzgebirge Aue. On 1 July 2009 was named as the new Director of Sport from FC Carl Zeiss Jena and on 23 March 2010 announced his leaking contract not to renew. In April 2010 earned his Coaching Licence in the Deutsche Sporthochschule Koln.

References

Sources

1965 births
Living people
German footballers
East German footballers
FC Carl Zeiss Jena players
German football managers
FC Energie Cottbus managers
FC Carl Zeiss Jena managers
2. Bundesliga players
FC Erzgebirge Aue managers
DDR-Oberliga players
3. Liga managers
Association football forwards
People from Thale
Footballers from Saxony-Anhalt
SC Preußen Münster players